The Arbegnoch were Ethiopian anti-fascist World War II resistance fighters in Italian East Africa from 1936 until 1941 who fought against Fascist Italy's occupation of the Ethiopian Empire.

The Patriot movement was primarily based in the rural Shewa, Gondar and Gojjam provinces, though it drew support from all over occupied Ethiopia. Several hundred Eritreans also participated. Small cells operated in Addis Ababa and other towns, known as Wust Arbagna (Insider Patriots). The Black Lions took part in the movement. In 1937/1938, there were an estimated 25,000 active Patriots in Ethiopia. The average band of resistance fighters was estimated in 1938 to have included 400 to 500 members, depending on the agricultural season. The Arbegnoch or Patriots were characterized as being Shifta by the Italians. The Patriots had the near-total support of the Ethiopian Orthodox Church. The majority of participants were Christian highlanders. Ethiopian Muslims were less involved in the Italo-Ethiopian conflict.

History

Italian invasion 

A couple months into the Second Italo-Ethiopian War on 9 December 1935, Ethiopian Minister of War Mulugeta Yeggazu ordered all chiefs in the north to undertake "patriotic resistance against the Italians for taking away the independence of Ethiopia". The Patriot movement only emerged in the spring of 1936 after the Battle of Maychew in the Tigray Region as scattered troops of the Army of the Ethiopian Empire resorted to guerrilla tactics against occupying forces. Local civilians joined in and operated independently near their homes. Early activities included stealing war materials, rolling boulders off cliffs at passing convoys, kidnapping messengers, cutting telephone lines, setting fire to administrative offices and fuel and ammunition dumps and killing collaborators.

As disruption increased, the Italians were forced to deploy more troops to Tigray, away from the campaign further south. The Italians began referring to the Patriots as shifta, which roughly translates from Amharic to English as "bandit"; the word also has a connotation of "one who rebels against an unjust authority" and many freedom fighters reclaimed the label and took pride in its usage. On 4 May, Patriots led by Haile Mariam Mammo ambushed an Italian column in Chacha, near Debre Berhan and killed approximately 170 Askari and took four Italians prisoner, who were later released. Addis Ababa fell to the advancing Italians on 5 May 1936 and the Ethiopians withdrew to nearby areas to regroup; Abebe Aregai went to Ankober, Balcha Safo to Gurage, Zewdu Asfaw to Mulo, Blatta Takale Wolde Hawariat to Limmu and the Kassa brothers (Aberra, Wondosson, and Asfawossen) to Selale. Haile Mariam conducted hit-and-run attacks around the capital. Emperor Haile Selassie fled the country with 117 chests of gold ingots which were used to fund his court in exile and the Patriots' activities.

The emperor left 10,000 troops under the command of Aberra Kassa with orders to continue resistance. Plans were made to storm the occupied capital but a lack of transport and radio equipment made it impossible to mount a coordinated attack. The deposed government in Gore was never able to provide any meaningful leadership to the Patriots or remaining military formations but sporadic resistance was undertaken by independent groups around the capital. On the night 26 June, members of the Black Lions destroyed three Italian aircraft in Nekemte and murdered twelve Italian officials, including Air Marshal Vincenzo Magliocco. The Italians had been hoping to gain support in the region by sending the party to talk with the local populace. The viceroy of the newly created Italian East Africa colony, Rodolfo Graziani, ordered the town to be bombed in retaliation for the killing of Magliocco (his deputy). Negative reactions from the locals forced Patriots to depart; Desta Damtew, the commander of the remnants of the Ethiopian Army, withdrew his troops to Arbegona. Surrounded by Italian forces, they retreated to Butajira, where they were defeated 19 February 1937 in the Battle of Gogetti. A total of 4,000 Patriots are estimated to have been killed in the battles, of whom 1,600, including Destaw, were executed.

Beginning of the guerrilla war 
The situation in Addis Ababa in the first weeks after the conquest was difficult for the Italians; communications were possible only through the long route from Eritrea, violence and disorder were widespread within the city, while Marshal Rodolfo Graziani, initially having only 9,000 soldiers, feared an attack by Ethiopian guerrillas who were reported "all around Addis Ababa"; there were rumors that many thousands of arbegnoch were ready to attack. The situation of the Italians improved in mid-July with the arrival of substantial reinforcements which increased the garrison to 35,000 men; moreover, new exhortations were arriving from Rome to the governor to extend the occupation and to "be harsh, implacable with all the Abyssinians..", Mussolini called for a "regime of absolute terror". 

The arbegnoch of Shewa were actually determined to attack Addis Ababa, in a meeting in Debre Libanos, with the presence of Aberra Kassa, Abune Petros and other leaders, a rash plan was decided to assault the capital with five separate columns, counting above all on exploiting a general uprising of the population. The assault began on 28 July 1936 on a foggy morning but, despite some successes, the guerrillas failed to coordinate their attacks; while Aberra Kassa's men arrived by surprise without encountering resistance as far as the center of Addis Ababa where they unleashed panic, Ficrè Mariam was stopped by the course of a flooded stream and then blocked by reinforced Italian units. In the meantime, Abebe Aregai's arbegnoch initially advanced almost as far as Graziani's residence but were then attacked by Eritrean askaris,  the last two Ethiopian columns failed on the first day even to enter into the city due to the nearby floods. Fighting in Addis Ababa continued until 30 July 1936, the arbegnoch of the Kassa brothers courageously held their positions despite counterattacks by the Italian-Eritrean forces led by generals Italo Gariboldi and Sebastiano Gallina, finally the guerrillas had to flee the city, due to attacks from the air force. One of the arbegnoch leaders, Abune Petros was captured and immediately executed by the Italians.
 

While in Shewa the guerrillas dominated the countryside, the attempt to organize a solid resistance movement in the west of the Abyssinian territory was unsuccessful due to the opposition of the leaders of the Oromo population, who were traditionally hostile to theAmhara rule. Marshal Graziani, urged by Mussolini, decided to intervene immediately in western Ethiopia by sending a small air expedition to Nekemte. On June 26 1936, th Italian air expedition landed in Nekemte to meet with local Oromo chiefs who had wished to submit to Italian rule. The next night a group of arbegnoch led by Kefle Nasibu and Belai Haile attacked the encamped Italians and massacred them. 12 Italians were killed and all of their aircraft were destroyed, among the dead were Italian aviators Vincenzo Magliocco and Antonio Locatelli. Despite this success, the Italians managed to foment the general revolt of Oromo tribes and on 8 October 1936 they returned to Nekemte where they welcomed the submission of important local leaders.

The anti-guerrilla operations of 1936 
On 11 October 1936, the Minister of Colonies Alessandro Lessona had arrived in Addis Ababa, to confer personally with Marshal Graziani; regarding the tactics to be followed to crush the Ethiopian resistance and ensure total domination over the territory. After observing the ongoing fighting between guerrillas and Italian troops, the minister immediately entered into conflict with Graziani and the generals accused of not acting with the necessary energy to eliminate the resistance. The governor then issued new draconian orders stating that it was "time to put an end to weaknesses" and requesting to be regularly informed of the "number of people who have gone to arms". Lessona left Addis Ababa on 21 October while Marshal Graziani began the general autumn offensive against the guerrillas of Shewa.

On 27 October 1936, the Italians launched an offensive against the guerrillas near Ejere. Eritrean askaris overran the positions of the guerrillas and killed many of them, including the feared Ethiopian resistance leader Ficrè Mariam. In the following weeks the Italians attacked the Shewan guerrillas in the Awash valley, after fierce fighting, the arbegnoch had to abandon the territories around the capital. The guerrillas of Gurage in southern Shewa led by Balcha Safo were attacked on 6 November 1936 by an Italian mechanized column led by Colonel Princivalle. After a valiant resistance the guerrillas were defeated and Balcha Safo was killed.

Imru Haile Selassie who was still resisting the Italians was forced to retreat south after the Welega Oromo submitted to Italian rule. The Italians followed him, and pinned him down on the north bank of the Gojeb River, where he surrendered on 19 December 1936.  He surrendered together with the chiefs Keflè Nasibù and Belai Haile, and a group of "Youth Ethiopians". On this occasion, Marshal Graziani decided to spare the life of the Abyssinian leader who, after consultations with Rome, was declared a prisoner of war and then deported to Italy.

After the failed attack on Addis Ababa, Wondosson Kassa decided to take refuge with his men around Mount Abuna Yosef before resuming guerrilla warfare in September 1936 near the town of Lalibela. Marshal Graziani took brutal measures against this resistance group, also employing, according to the instructions of Minister Lessona, mustard gases that were used extensively on the villages between Lalibelà and Bilbolà Ghiorghis. Wondosson Kassa was finally intercepted with his men near the source of Tekezé River and on 10 December 1936 was captured by Wollo Oromo collaborators, in the same evening he was then executed. The two other Kassa brothers (Aberra and Asfawossen), had taken refuge in Fiche, most of their men went to join the resistance leader of Abebe Aregai, they had agreed to surrender to the Italians on 21 December 1936. The two Abyssinian leaders were then executed on 18:35 on the same day.

After the death of the Kassa brothers and the capture of Ras Imru, at the end of 1936 only Desta Damtew still remained active after having moved with about 2,000 men to the Sidamo region, in November he had repeatedly attacked the Italian forces of General Carlo Geloso before retreating to the mountainous region of Arbegona. With Dejazmach Gabremariam, Dejazmach Beyene Merid (Shum of Bale Province), and a dwindling number of soldiers, for the next few months Ras Desta eluded the Italians until they were trapped near Lake Shala in the Battle of Gogetti and annihilated. Wounded, Ras Desta managed to escape, only to be captured and hanged by Italian soldiers on 24 February 1937. His body left hanging for days the Italian authorities and the propaganda exalted the victory and the execution which seemed to symbolize the definitive victory of fascist Italy

The attack on Graziani and the reprisals 

On 19 February 1937 – Yekatit 12 according to the Ge'ez calendar – saw the attempted assassination of Marshal Graziani by Eritrean rebels Abraham Deboch and Mogos Asgedom in Addis Ababa. The Italian response was immediate. According to Mockler, "Italian carabinieri had fired into the crowds of beggars and poor assembled for the distribution of alms; and it is said that the Federal Secretary, Guido Cortese, even fired his revolver into the group of Ethiopian dignitaries standing around him." Hours later, Cortese gave the fatal order:

For the rest of that day, through Saturday and Sunday, Italians killed Ethiopians with daggers and truncheons to the shouts of "Duce! Duce!" and "Civiltà Italiana!" They doused native houses with petrol and set them on fire. They broke into the homes of local Greeks and Armenians and lynched their servants. Some even posed on the corpses of their victims to have their photographs taken. In three days, the Italians had killed between 1,400 and 30,000 Ethiopians in Addis Ababa alone. 

The attempted murder provided the Italians with the reason to implement Mussolini's order, issued as early as 3 May 1936, for the summary execution of "The Young Ethiopians", the small group of intellectuals who had received college education from American and European colleges. The same day as the assassination, a military tribunal was set up, and by nightfall, 62 Ethiopians were tried and shot at the Alem Bekagn prison in Addis Ababa. "The Graziani Massacre marked the almost total liquidation of the intellectual component of the Resistance," writes Bahru Zewde.

Thousands of Ethiopians of all classes were sent to detention camps at Danan in the Ogaden and Nokra in the Dahlak Archipelago. Conditions at Danan were inhospitable, and Graziani had given orders that the prisoners would receive only the bare minimum of food and water. As Sbacchi notes, "Poor facilities, including latrines, the humid climate, malaria, stomach infections, and venereal disease took many lives, especially among those compelled to work on the irrigation canal or on the banana and sugar-cane plantations." Between ten percent and half of the prisoners died at Danan.

Conditions at Nokra were even worse than at Danan, according to Sbacchi. The detainees sent there joined 500 prisoners serving life sentences for serious political crimes, increasing the total number incarcerated to 1,500. The inmates suffered from lack of fresh water, sunstroke, marsh fever, and dysentery.

The climax of the violence was reached in May 1937 with the tragic events of the Debre Libanos massacre. Investigators found that Abraha and Mogus had stayed a while at Debra Libanos, and slight circumstantial evidence suggested that the monks had foreknowledge of their plans. Marshal Graziani decided to retaliate by striking the sacred place of Debre Libanos. On the morning of 21 May 1937, Muslim Libyan and Somali askaris (45th Muslim Colonial Battalion) led by General Pietro Maletti executed 297 monks and 23 laymen. Three days later they would mow down 129 deacons, thus bringing the number of victims to 449. Maletti sent Graziani a telegram with the inscription "Complete liquidation", as proof of the massacre, and Graziani communicated the new number of those executed in Rome.

However, the violence of the repression and the apparent successes of the "colonial police" operations did not consolidate the Italian domination in Ethiopia in a decisive way, on the contrary, the growing brutality of exasperated the population and increased hostility towards the Italians.

The Lasta revolt
A rebellion in Lasta led by Hailu Kebede was initiated in the summer of 1937, this rebellion would progressively extended to other Ethiopian regions, the guerrillas proclaimed holy war against the Italians in response to the massacres of Coptic Christians by Muslim askaris following the assassination attempt on Marshal Graziani. By the month of August 1937, two Italian brigades were forced to withdraw from Begemder due to increased guerrilla attacks and in Gojjam forces under Belay Zekele successfully raided colonial garrisons. Major Liverani's column was destroyed by the warriors of Abebe Aregai, Mesfin Scilesci and Haile Mariam Mammo near Ankober. Hailu Kebede especially in the month of August achieved important successes; his guerrillas attacked and annihilated several garrisons, while in September they inflicted heavy losses on a colonial battalion and devastated the Quoram communications center along the main Asmara-Addis Ababa road.

Marshal Graziani, surprised and shocked by the sudden bad news, seemed unable to control the situation and indulged in recriminations, especially against the governor of Amhara Governorate, Alessandro Pirzio Biroli. The news of the Ethiopian revolt aroused strong emotion in Italy as well; Mussolini urged Graziani's return to Addis Ababa and sent reinforcements, while Minister Lessona authorized the use of "every means" against the rebels, "including gas". On 19 September Marshal Graziani finally managed to concentrate large forces in Lasta and began the repression against the bands of Hailu Kebede who suffered attacks from the air force and mustard gas; the guerrillas abandoned Sekota and were surrounded, Kebede after a tough resistance was finally captured by colonial soldiers on September 24, 1937 and was executed via beheading.

Marshal Graziani returned to the capital on 3 October 1937, but despite the end of the Lasta revolt, the guerrilla warfare was spreading in Begemeder, Gojjam and Semien, many garrisons and isolated Italian residences were attacked and destroyed. Governor Pirzio Biroli was unable to restore order. The guerrillas obtained important successes in Gojjam under the leadership of Belay Zekele and Mengesha Gembere, on 13 and 14 September many Italian garrisons were attacked and surrounded and on 3 November the leaders of the revolt issued a proclamation stating that "all of Ethiopia is in revolt to expel the Italians". In December 1937 the governor made another attempt to regain control of the Gojjam but the new offensive immediately began with a disaster when on December 7 Colonel Barbacini's column was attacked and disrupted by the forces of Mengesha Gembere, two colonial battalions were surrounded and destroyed by the guerrillas.

On 10 November 1937, Mussolini privately informed Graziani that he believed that "his task is over" and announced his recall and the appointment of Duke of Aosta. Despite the viceroy's protests, Mussolini stood by his decisions, he informed the Prince Amedeo, Duke of Aosta of his forthcoming assignment and appointed General Ugo Cavallero, military superior commander over East Africa. Duke of Aosta was appointed by Mussolini to replace Graziani as Viceroy of Italian East Africa. He was more open-minded than his predecessor and well-suited to encourage the co-operation of the Ethiopian public, he assumed his responsibilities on 22 December 1937.

The anti-guerrilla operations of 1938 
The Italians entrusted anti-guerrilla operations mainly to the colonial brigades of askaris, manned by Italian officers and non-commissioned officers and made up of Eritrean, Somali or Libyan troops used to moving and fighting in East Africa. In addition to the colonial brigades, the Italians also employed local irregular bands led by Italian officers, who were entrusted with the most violent repressive tasks. These troops, showed weaknesses in their organization and cohesion and suffered from high rates of desertion.

General Cavallero prepared an ambitious plan of global operations to crush the Abyssinian resistance before the beginning of the heavy rains. The new cycle of operations began on 19 January 1938 in Gojjam which was attacked from the north and south by three separate columns while other forces blocked the fords on the Nile to prevent the guerrillas from escaping. Despite the considerable deployment of forces, the campaign did not achieve definitive results. The garrisons besieged by the guerrillas were reliefed and the prolonged clashes at Gojjam against the men of Belay Zekele, Mengesha Gembere, and Meslin Scilesci ended in March 1938 with the retreat of the guerrillas who dispersed throughout the territory. In the month of April, the Italian-Eritrean columns joined Debra Markos and continued vast mopping-up operations against the resistance leaders of Mengesha Gembere and Belay Zekele who had, according to Italian sources, suffered over 2,300 casualties, but still managed to escape the operation. General Cavallero's forces were able to occupy the territory, increase the garrisons and extend the lines of communication but in turn had 350 dead and 1,200 wounded in five months in Gojjam, mostly askaris and colonial troops.

In June 1938 Italian forces encircled Ankober and the surrounding highlands in an attempt to pacify resistance in the region. Haile Mariam was the only Patriot leader who decided to try and effect a break-out and with 500 men he assaulted the Italians in a futile attempt to breach their cordon. He was mortally wounded on 6 June during a major clash at Gorfo in Bulga. On 1 June, General Ugo Cavallero moved north to surround Abebe, and keep him from returning to Menz, and although Abebe made three unsuccessful attempts to break through the Italian lines before the rainy season, after the rains his Arbegnoch were able to return to the comparative safety of Menz.

Guerrilla warfare on the eve of World War II
The repressive operations of 1938 therefore did not obtain decisive results, moreover, in this period the contrasts between the Duke of Aosta were accentuated, convinced of the need to reduce the violence and brutality of the fight against the guerrillas, and General Cavallero determined to maintain operational control of the war against the guerrillas, in Rome Mussolini expressed his discontent with the situation in East Africa. In early 1939 the senior commander in East Africa therefore resumed major military operations against the resistance by organizing an ambitious operation against the fighters of Abebe Aregai, General Cavallero entrusted Colonel Orlando Lorenzini colonial forces to mop up Menz, however, the results were not conclusive, the main guerrilla leaders escaped the roundup which lasted until the end of March 1939.
 

In December 1938, the Communist Party of Italy had already sent a mission to Ethiopia to assess the situation, make contact with the Ethiopian guerrillas and start a training program. Giuseppe Di Vittorio spoke about it with Spanish Civil War veteran Anton Ukmar in the winter of 1937 and the decision was made on 8 December 1938, the first to leave and reach Ethiopia via Khartoum was Ilio Barontini who in February 1939 was already able to send a confident report on the qualities and determination of the Abyssinian fighters. In the spring Ukmar and Domenico Rolla also left, accompanied by the French secret agent Colonel Paul Robert Monnier and by the envoy of the Negus Lorenzo Taezaz. After meeting in May 1939 in Abyssinian territory, Ukmar and Barontini split to begin their collaborative and training projects; the Ukmar mission was established in Gojjam and in the Gondar area, while Barontini, who acted under the pseudonym of "Paul Langlois" or "Paolo De Bargili", entered into contact with Mengesha Gembere and his guerrillas.

On 2 December 1940, a large Patriot force under Admique Besha and Jagama Kello overran the Italian garrison at Addis Alem. 78 Italian soldiers were killed and over 2,000 rifles were captured, along with several grenades and artillery pieces.

References

Sources

Further reading

External links
  Berhe, Aregawi Revisiting Resistance in Italian-occupied Ethiopia: The Patriots’ Movement (1936–1941) and the Redefinition of Post-war Ethiopia
 Berhe, Aregawi Spirit vs. War Machine: A Patriotic Resistance to Italian Occupation of Ethiopia (1936–1941) PhD (27 February 2015) 

1936 in Ethiopia
1941 in Ethiopia
Second Italo-Ethiopian War
African resistance to colonialism